South Korean singer Hyolyn has released one studio album, three extended plays, and sixteen singles. She was a member of the girl group Sistar until their disbandment in 2017. Since leaving Starship Entertainment, Hyolyn has established her own production company, bridʒ, and released a digital single titled "To Do List" on February 6, 2018.

Albums

Studio albums

Extended plays

Singles

As lead artist

As featured artist

Collaborative singles

Soundtrack appearances

Compilation appearances

Other charted songs

Music videos

Production credits

Notes

See also
 Sistar discography
 Sistar19#Discography

References

Sistar
Discographies of South Korean artists
K-pop discographies